The 18th Grey Cup was played on December 6, 1930, before 3,914 fans at the Varsity Stadium at Toronto.

The Toronto Balmy Beach Beachers defeated the Regina Roughriders 11–6. Regina scored the first touchdown for a western club in a Grey Cup game.

External links
 
 

Grey Cup
Grey Cups hosted in Toronto
Grey Cup
1930 in Ontario
December 1930 sports events
1930s in Toronto
Saskatchewan Roughriders